is a Japanese light novel series by  and illustrated by Shirotaka. The series is about a jobless and hopeless man who dies after having a sad and withdrawn life and reincarnates in a fantasy world while keeping his memories, determined to enjoy his new life without regrets under the name Rudeus Greyrat.

Originally published on the internet web novel website Shōsetsuka ni Narō in November 2012, a year later it was announced the series would receive a print release under Media Factory's MF Books imprint with illustrations done by a Pixiv user called  A manga adaptation by Yuka Fujikawa began serialization in the June 2014 issue of Monthly Comic Flapper. Seven Seas Entertainment licensed the tankōbon volumes of the manga for localization in North America. The company also has licensed the original light novels. An anime television series adaptation produced by Studio Bind aired from January to December 2021. A second season is set to premiere in 2023.

Mushoku Tensei: Jobless Reincarnation has become a success, with its web novel published from Syosetu's rankings has made cumulative appearances as the most popular work on the website, and later expands into a franchise began in 2014. As of February 2022, over 10 million copies of the light novels have been sold.

Plot

An unnamed 34-year-old Japanese NEET is evicted from his home following his parents' death and skipping the funeral. Upon some self-introspection, he concluded his life was ultimately pointless but still intercepts a speeding truck heading towards a group of teenagers in an attempt to do something meaningful for once in his life and manages to pull one of them out of harm's way before dying. Awakening in a baby's body, he realizes his being reincarnated in a world of sword and sorcery and resolves to become successful in his new life, discarding his past identity for his new life as Rudeus Greyrat. Due to inherited affinity and early training, Rudeus becomes highly skilled at magic. During his childhood, he becomes a student of demon magician Roxy Migurdia, a friend to demihuman Sylphiette, and a magic teacher to noble heiress Eris Boreas Greyrat.

As Rudeus finally feels like he has found his place in the world, a major magical catastrophe destroys his nation, teleporting and stranding hundreds of thousands of people far from home‚some into dangerous places or situations, resulting in their deaths due to murder, war, execution, monster attack, or exposure to the elements. Stranded practically on the other side of the world in a foreign land, Rudeus resolves to escort Eris home with aid by a befriended strong warrior named Ruijerd Superdia. During his thousands-of-miles-long journey, Rudeus is contacted by a mysterious being, the Human-God, who gives him questionable advice for an unknown agenda. After three years of struggle—including being defeated by a mighty world-class warrior named Orsted—Rudeus successfully escorts Eris home to the remains of his shattered homeland. Unfortunately, political events and a personal misunderstanding with Eris ultimately leave Rudeus heartbroken.

Two years later, the incident with Eris has made Rudeus impotent, so he enrolls in Ronoa Magic University under the Human-God's advice. He is reunited with Sylphiette, who heals his impotence, and the two are wedded shortly after. Rudeus rejoins his father's quest to save his mother, ignoring the Human-God's advice, reuniting and developing a romantic relationship with Roxy during the adventure and taking her as his second wife. He is then visited by a dying future version of himself, warning him that the Human-God will cause the deaths of everyone he cares about. To appease the Human-God, Rudeus attempts to kill Orsted, one of Human-God's enemies. However, Rudeus offers his allegiance to Orsted in exchange for his family's protection instead. Shortly after, Rudeus takes Eris as his third wife, following a reconciliation for the misunderstanding. The series continues episodically with a series of story arcs based around Rudeus' work with Orsted to ensure the Human-God's precise demise, as well as his daily life and growing family. Finally, after a large-scale attack on Rudeus' life fails, the Human God gives up on his plans against him, opting to scheme against Rudeus's descendants instead. In the end, Rudeus lives the rest of his life peacefully before his natural death at the age of 74.

Production
Rifujin na Magonote commented that he created Rudeus aware of his controversial personality. He intended Rudeus' actions would be more meaningful in the process. He had no issue criticizing Rudeus at an early stage and left it to the audience to judge him. Magnote wanted the audience to pay attention to a specific side of his character and be able to relate to him. Earlier, he said that I felt a big response in episodes 6 to 7 of the web version of the novels, but that was just when Roxy took Rudeus out. Thanks to her, Rudeus overcomes the trauma. Such a story gave a warm impression to his readers and made him think, "Let's grow in this direction."

After publishing the first parts of his work, Rifujin wrote that he intended the series to last at least a hundred chapters. Due to criticism towards his work, Rifujin considered ending the series prematurely but was inspired to continue when his work reached the first place on Syosetu's daily rankings. Originally, the story arc where Rudeus' reunites with Aisha was supposed to be completely different from the published work. The author intended to have Lilia die off-screen, and Aisha to be hiding under a different identity. However, he found Lilia's death anticlimactic and decided against it; thus, he had to rewrite the story arc to make sense of her survival and lack of contact. Rifujin stated the story arc might be bizarre due to the changes but expresses no regrets in his decision; he noted Lilia's survival made him reconsider Zenith's condition in the story.

Media

Web novel and light novel

Rifujin na Magonote published his work on the online web novel website, Shōsetsuka ni Narō (Shortened to Syosetu); the first chapter was uploaded on November 22, 2012. In November 2013, the author announced his work was to be released as a light novel under Media Factory's MF Books imprint; regardless, the author stated his intentions to continue publishing his chapters online. The illustrator for the light novel is a Pixiv user called SiroTaka. Seven Seas Entertainment has licensed the light novels for publication in North America. They made localization changes in their translations of the light novels, such as toning down Rudeus' perverted behavior and removing references to rape. They later decided to "re-evaluate" their localization decisions.

Rifujin intends to create a sequel to the web novel series based in the Six-Sided Universe. On January 15, 2021, the author stated that he plans to finish the Orc Eroica web novel first. He also suffers from health problems and plans to heal before starting the new work.

Manga

In the May 2014 issue of Monthly Comic Flapper, it was announced that the manga adaptation of Mushoku Tensei by Yuka Fujikawa would premiere in the June issue; though Yuka is the author of the manga series, character designs are credited to SiroTaka. Media Works collected the individual chapters into tankōbon volumes; the first volume was released in October 2014. In January 2015, Seven Seas Entertainment announced its licensing of the manga series for localization in North America under the title Mushoku Tensei: Jobless Reincarnation.

A second manga series illustrated by Kazusa Yoneda, titled  began serialization on NTT Solmare's Comic Cmoa website on December 20, 2021. It adapts the light novel's seventh volume.

Spin-offs
A spin-off manga illustrated by Shoko Iwami, titled , began serialization online in Kadokawa Shoten's ComicWalker website on December 21, 2017. As of January 23, 2023, eleven tankōbon volumes have been published. Seven Seas Entertainment licensed the manga in September 2019 for print and digital release.

A second spin-off manga illustrated by Kaede Nogiwa, titled , was serialized in ASCII Media Works' Comic Dengeki Daioh "g" magazine from October 25, 2018, to August 27, 2020. Three tankōbon volumes were published from October 26, 2019, to December 26, 2020.

A third spin-off manga illustrated by Take Higake, titled , was serialized online on Square Enix's Gangan Online service from March 15 to October 11, 2022.

Anime

On March 15, 2019, the official website of MF Books announced that an anime adaptation of Mushoku Tensei would be produced. The anime was later announced on October 18, 2019, to be a television series, which is directed by Manabu Okamoto and animated by Studio Bind, with Kazutaka Sugiyama designing the characters, and Yoshiaki Fujisawa composing the music. Egg Firm is credited for production. The series was originally scheduled to premiere in 2020, but it was delayed until January 2021.  The first half aired from January 11 to March 22, 2021 on Tokyo MX, KBS, BS11, and SUN.

At the conclusion of the first half of the series on March 22, 2021, a second half was announced.  The second half was originally set to premiere in July 2021, but was delayed to October 2021. The second half aired from October 4 to December 20, 2021. Toho released both parts of the first season on Blu-ray across 4 volumes, with the first volume releasing on April 21, 2021. The anime's fourth Blu-ray volume was released on March 16, 2022, and included an unaired episode.

All of the openings and endings were performed by Yuiko Ōhara. 

Funimation licensed the series and streamed it on its website in North America, Mexico, Brazil and the British Isles, in parts of Europe, Central Asia and North Africa through Wakanim, and in Australia and New Zealand through AnimeLab. The series also streamed on Hulu in the United States. On February 13, 2021, Funimation announced the series would be receiving an English dub, with the first episode premiering the next day. Following Sony's acquisition of Crunchyroll, the series was moved to Crunchyroll. Crunchyroll released the first 11 episodes on DVD and Blu-ray in North America on December 5, 2022. Muse Communication has licensed the series in Southeast Asia and South Asia and streamed it on their Muse Asia YouTube channel and its respective regional variants, and on iQIYI, Bilibili and WeTV in Southeast Asia, Netflix in South Asia and Southeast Asia, Catchplay in Indonesia and Singapore, meWATCH in Singapore, and Sushiroll in Indonesia.  

On March 6, 2022, it was announced that a second season has been green-lit. It is set to premiere in 2023.

Video games
A smartphone game developed by Aiming Co., Ltd. titled  was released on Android and iOS on March 27, 2021. The game ended service on August 31, 2022.

A role-playing video game, titled Mushoku Tensei: Jobless Reincarnation – Quest of Memories, has been announced for the Microsoft Windows, Nintendo Switch and the PlayStation 4. It will be developed by Lancarse and published by Bushiroad Games.

Audio drama
An audio drama adaptation, titled , was released by Frontier Works on April 26, 2017.

Reception

Web and light novel
In the Kono Light Novel ga Sugoi! 2017 by Takarajimasha, Mushoku Tensei reached the fourth place in the ranking. It is ranked seventh for the 2018 edition; and for the 2019 edition, the series is placed eighth. On Syosetu's rankings, the web novel made cumulative appearances as the most popular work on the website. The light novels have appeared on Oricon's charts and have also ranked on T-site's novel popularity polls. By August 2021, the light novels reached 8.5 million copies in circulation. As of February 2022, the light novel series had over 10 million copies in circulation.

However, the main character Rudeus has been criticized for being overtly perverted. Real Sound was concerned about how the narrative portrays Rudeus' previous life as it appears to focus highly on retired school students and issues they had at school comparing it to the famous isekai Re:Zero − Starting Life in Another World. Nevertheless, Rudeus commitment to surpassing his flaws in his new life was noted to turn him into a more sympathetic main character. Re:Zero − Starting Life in Another World novelist Tappei Nagatsuki said that one of the strongest points of Mushoku Tensei was the handling of Rudeus who is noted to suffer in a similar fashion to the main character from the visual novel Clannad.

Anime
The anime adaptation received overwhelmingly positive responses from both critics and audiences and is considered one of the best anime of 2021. It also received numerous accolades, including three wins (Favorite Fantasy and Favorite Supporting Female Character for Ghislaine Dedoldia) over seven nominations, including the New Anime of the Season at Winter 2021 (2nd Place for General Rankings) for Winter 2021 and two wins (Favorite Action or Adventure and Favorite Supporting Male Character for Ruijerd Superdia) over sixteen nominations including runner-up for Fall 2021 at the 8th Anime Trending Awards, making it the most nominations at two seasons in a single year. Ruijerd Superdia is the second character from Mushoku Tensei to win a seasonal best-supporting character award after Ghislaine Dedoldia, who also won as best supporting female character for the previous season.

Controversies

Aisha Greyrat's after-story
One of the web novel short stories from the after-story collection Redundancy, titled "The Moment Aisha Greyrat Stopped Being a Maid", sparked a lot of controversy among its Japanese readers. In response, the author had initially planned to make some revisions, but figured it would not be good enough, and after receiving a notice from Shōsetsuka ni Narō management that it violated their terms of service, on February 24, 2016, the author announced that he had decided to scrap the short story altogether and would write a remake in the future.

LexBurner's controversy
On February 8, 2021, before the premiere of the fifth episode of the anime adaptation, a Chinese streaming network, Bilibili, temporarily halted the streaming of the anime on the grounds of a "technical failure." According to fan speculation, it might be linked to the actions of the popular Chinese influencer LexBurner, who insulted the series and its fans, with one of his remarks saying that it is "for bottom-feeders in the social hierarchy." Incited by his words, his followers went to the media-reviewing website, Douban, to review-bomb the series with a 1-star rating; although the series concurrently enjoyed a 9.2/10 rating on Bilibili. This has led to LexBurner, who was one of Bilibili's top streamers, being banned from the site. Later, author Rifujin na Magonote commented on LexBurner's actions as follows: "His words are only his personal opinion, and he is free to hold whatever views he likes. Although I am displeased at how he has insulted other viewers, anime is not made only for successful people, so I hope that those who can enjoy it will enjoy it." He further commented: "If that is the kind of online presence he is, that's just the way it is sometimes. Even in Japan, there are plenty of people like him, although they might not have his influence. As far as I am concerned, instead of engaging with him, I think it is more important to ignore him and grow your own communities. Thank you!".

Notes

References

External links
  at Shōsetsuka ni Narō 
 Official light novel website 
 Official manga website 
 Official anime website 
 

2014 Japanese novels
2021 anime television series debuts
ASCII Media Works manga
Anime and manga based on light novels
Anime and manga controversies
Anime postponed due to the COVID-19 pandemic
Crunchyroll anime
Fiction about reincarnation
Gangan Online manga
Harem anime and manga
Isekai anime and manga
Isekai novels and light novels
Japanese webcomics
Kadokawa Dwango franchises
Kadokawa Shoten manga
Light novels first published online
Light novels
Media Factory manga
Muse Communication
Seinen manga
Seven Seas Entertainment titles
Shōnen manga
Shōsetsuka ni Narō
Television censorship in China
Toho Animation
Tokyo MX original programming
Upcoming anime television series
Webcomics in print